Raw Forever is the second compilation album by American rapper Cormega. It was released on September 27, 2011, under Aura Records. The first disc is a collection of Cormega' biggest hits and most well-known songs, the second disc consists of 11 new remixes recorded with live instrumentation performed by the band The Revelations.

Track listing 
By iTunes.

References 

Cormega albums
2011 albums